Dmytro Hololobov (born 1 January 1985), is a Ukrainian football defender.

See also
 2005 FIFA World Youth Championship squads#Ukraine

External links
 Profile on Official Site

1985 births
Living people
Sportspeople from Kropyvnytskyi
Ukrainian footballers
Ukraine youth international footballers
Ukrainian Premier League players
FC Dnipro Cherkasy players
FC Obolon-Brovar Kyiv players
FC Kharkiv players
FC Stal Kamianske players
FC Sevastopol players
FC Zirka Kropyvnytskyi players
Association football defenders